Samuel Maddox (died 1979) was a British trade unionist.

Maddox worked as a baker, and joined the Bakers, Food and Allied Workers' Union (BFAWU).  In 1967, he won election to the union's executive council, but the following year he instead began working full-time for the union as a district organiser.

In 1975, Maddox was elected as general secretary of the union, serving until his death in 1979.

References

Year of birth missing
1979 deaths
General secretaries of British trade unions